Fuglafjørður is a village on Eysturoy's east coast in the Faroe Islands. Its name means "fjord of birds".

The village is at the edge of a bay and expands into the surrounding steep hills. 
The town centre is located close to the harbour and contains most of the shops and services. The harbour in Fuglafjørður is busy, as the town's economy is based on the processing of fish and fish meal. There is fishing-industry, a slip, production of trawl and also oil-depots. In the 1970s there was a terrible stink from the fishing-industry but that has since been solved.

In the past years Fuglafjørður  has also become famous for its newly established cultural centre in the town centre that has become one of the main cultural attractions in Eysturoy.

History and development 
It was found by removing four or five more recent layers of ruins, showing a continuity of habitation for many centuries.

In the 1840s the small village Hellur in north of Fuglafjørður was established. However this village never grew large and now only approximately 30 of the municipality's inhabitants live there.

In the 1980s the suburb of Kambsdalur was established, where around 180 people live. In Kambsdalur there is also a large industrial cluster, the educational centre of the northeastern Faroes and the regional sportscentre used mainly for handball, volleyball and indoor football.

Sports
The local football team is ÍF Fuglafjørður.

Business 
Fuglafjørður is (although its small size) home of many major business in the Faroe Islands. These include:

 Vónin, global provider of fishing gear such as trawls
 Framherji, operator of fishing ships
 Pelagos, one of the most advanced pelagic plants in the North Atlantic
 Sandgrevstur, owner and operator of cargo vessels
 KJ Hydralik, marine services
 JT Electric, one of the leading company in the world, producing and selling underwater lamps and cameras for the aquaculture
 Havsbrún, producer of fish feed

Notable people
Notable people that were born or lived in Fuglafjørður include:
Eilif Samuelsen (born 1934), teacher and politician
Trygvi Samuelsen (1907–1985), lawyer
Heðin Kambsdal (born 1951), teacher and painter
Frits Jóhannesen, teacher and painter
Jógan á Lakjuni (born 1952), teacher, politician and composer
Bartal Eliasen (born 1976), footballer
Abraham Løkin (born 1959), footballer
Høgni Zachariasen (born 1982), footballer
Henning Hansen (born 1980), footballer

Twin towns – sister cities
Fuglafjørður is twinned with:
  Aalborg, Denmark
  Húsavík, Iceland
  Ilulissat, Greenland

See also 
 List of towns in the Faroe Islands

References

External links 
 Faroeislands.dk: Fuglafjordur Images and description of all cities on the Faroe Islands.

 
Populated places in the Faroe Islands
Ports and harbours of the Faroe Islands
Municipalities of the Faroe Islands
Eysturoy